Á baðkari til Betlehem (English: On A Bathtub To Bethlehem) is an Icelandic television series that first aired on Icelandic public television channel Sjónvarpið in December 1990. The show was the second televised advent calendar produced in Iceland after Jólin nálgast í Kærabæ from 1988, and is a part of  Jóladagatal Sjónvarpsins, an ongoing series of televised Advent calendars.

The show follows two eight-year-old children, Hafliði and Stína, who embark on an adventurous journey to Bethlehem, in order to bring Baby Jesus the gifts of gold, frankincense and myrrh. Their form of transport is a magical flying bathtub lent to them by the concertmistress Dagbjört, who the children suspect of being an actual angel. On their way to Bethlehem, the children face numerous challenges and obstructions, most notable being their repeated encounters with the evil bird Klemmi, who is the main antagonist of the show.

Hafliði and Stína were both played by adults; Kjartan Bjargmundsson and Sigrún Waage respectively. All the other characters, both male and female, were portrayed by actress Inga Hildur Haraldsdóttir, in numerous guises.

Having been rerun in 1995 and 2004, the show has gained a cult following in Iceland, especially among teenagers and young adults who grew up watching the show in its early runs.

A novella bearing the same name, and following the same storyline, was published at the time of the show's first run in 1990. The novella was illustrated by Brian Pilkington.

List of episodes

References

1990s Icelandic television series
1990 Icelandic television series debuts
1990 Icelandic television series endings
Christmas television series